Santa Rosa is a department in Guatemala. The capital is Cuilapa.

History

1913 earthquake
On Saturday 8 March 1913 and magnitude 6.4 earthquake hit Santa Rosa, destroying its department capital, Cuilapa. Both the initial quake and the after shocks destroyed a lot of private homes, and also the cathedral and the prison, leaving behind significant human losses; similar destruction occurred at Barberena, Cerro Redondo, Llano Grande and El Zapote. Fraijanes, Pueblo Nuevo Viñas, Coatepeque and Jalpatagua were also affected. Around Cuilapa, there were landslides and road blockades, and even a long crack was reported at Los Esclavos hill.

Municipalities 
 Barberena
 Casillas
 Chiquimulilla
 Cuilapa
 Guazacapán
 Nueva Santa Rosa
 Oratorio
 Pueblo Nuevo Viñas
 San Juan Tecuaco
 San Rafael Las Flores
 Santa Cruz Naranjo
 Santa María Ixhuatán
 Santa Rosa de Lima
 Taxisco

Geography

Culture

Municipal fairs

Tourism

Geographic location

See also 
 
 
 List of places in Guatemala

Notes and references

References

Bibliography

External links
 Interactive department map

 
Departments of Guatemala